Lurabi (also Romanized as Lūrābī) is a village in Quri Qaleh Rural District, Shahu District, Ravansar County, Kermanshah Province, Iran. At the 2006 census, its population was 45, in 6 families.

References 

Populated places in Ravansar County